An EMD SD35 is a 6-axle diesel-electric locomotive built by General Motors Electro-Motive Division between June 1964 and January 1966. Power was provided by an EMD 567D3A, 16-cylinder engine which generated . A  fuel tank was used on this unit.

Original Owners

Preservation 
Three EMD SD35s survive in preservation in the United States, with one rebuilt. They include:
Baltimore and Ohio #7402 is preserved at the B&O Railroad Museum in Baltimore, Maryland. Built in 1964 for helper service on the grades of the Allegheny Mountains, it went to Chessie System in 1973 then was replaced by the SD50s in the mid 80’s. It was patched to CSX 4550 in 1987, and retired. Then in 1995 it was donated to the museum, and restored to its B&O appearance as B&O 7402.
Vintage Locomotives Inc 1216 is at the Southern Appalachia Railway Museum in Oak Ridge, Tennessee. Built in 1965 for the L&N as 1216, it became SCL Family Lines 4508 sometime after 1971 then to SBD in 1982 and CSX in 1987 and was retired in 1988. It was then sold to Minnesota Valley as 322, where it continued to operate until being sold to PREX then to MALX. In 2008 it was renumbered to 1216, painted primer red-orange and shipped to SARM.
Western Maryland rebuilt SD38P 7436 is sublettered for Georges Creek Railroad (GCK) and stored in Westernport, Maryland. Built in 1964, it and all other SD35 on the WM were repainted into the circus scheme in 1969. It went to Chessie System in 1973 and then it was bought by BN some time after, rebuilt to an SD38P and numbered 6267. In 1996 it went to BNSF and kept its number until 2009 when it was renumbered to 1556. It was retired in 2011 and sent to the GCK and was restored and renumbered to WM 7436 along with WM SD40 7471 (rebuilt to a SD40M-2) in 2012, and was on display at the WMSR in 2013 until returning to the GCK and put in storage.

References 
 
 Thompson, J. David. EMD SD35 and related models Original Owners. Retrieved on August 27, 2006

External links 
 
www.railgoat.railfan.net/sp_sd35/index.html
http://espee.railfan.net/spsd35.html

SD35
C-C locomotives
Diesel-electric locomotives of the United States
Railway locomotives introduced in 1964
Freight locomotives
Standard gauge locomotives of the United States